Lindsey Dryden is a British film director, producer and writer.

Early life
Dryden was born in Stroud, in Gloucestershire, England. She learned to play piano as a child from her father. She studied at Goldsmiths, University of London, and was awarded a Bachelor of Arts with First Class honours. Dryden has been mentored by The National Film & Television School, Women In Film & Television, 45 Years director Andrew Haigh, and BFI Flare.

Career
Dryden began her career working on television documentaries for the BBC, Channel 4, The History Channel, Current TV and others, before moving into independent film.

Dryden has directed and produced films that have screened at numerous top international festivals, including SXSW, Sundance, Tribeca, True/False, Sheffield Doc/Fest, HotDocs, New York's Lincoln Center and the British Film Institute. Her work has been released theatrically in the UK and US, exhibited at Tate Modern and Tate Britain, streamed on Vogue.com, featured in Elle (magazine), and broadcast on Netflix, PBS, BBC and Channel 4.

Her directing credits include feature documentary Lost and Sound (SXSW, 2012), short documentary Close Your Eyes And Look At Me (True/False, 2009) and Jackie Kay: One Person Two Names, commissioned for Tate Britain's Queer British Art 2017.

For directing Lost and Sound she was nominated Best New UK Filmmaker at Open City Docs and Best Female-Directed Film at Sheffield Doc/Fest. The film went on to screen and win awards at festivals globally, including at ReelAbilities  and Napa Valley Film Festival.

Dryden produced SXSW-debuting documentary series Trans In America. One of those short films, Trans In America: Texas Strong, won the Emmy for Outstanding Short Documentary on 24 September 2019 as well as a Webby Award and a Webby People's Voice Award in May 2019.

Dryden produced Sundance award-winning feature documentary Unrest (dir: Jennifer Brea), which  premiered in competition at the 2017 Sundance Film Festival, won a Sundance Special Jury Award, won a 2018 Independent Lens Audience Award, and was shortlisted for the Academy Award for Best Documentary Feature at the 2017 Oscars.

Her other producing credits include short documentary Little Ones (dir: Joanna Coates, 2013), and a verite documentary series with the ACLU about transgender civil rights (2018). She co-produced Sheffield Doc/Fest VR award-winning Unrest VR (2017), with Jennifer Brea, Arnaud Colinart and Amaury La Burthe, and in 2013 was nominated Best Producer at Underwire, a festival celebrating female filmmakers, for Little Ones.  The film was developed as part of the London Borough Film Fund Challenge.
 
Dryden is a founding member of Queer Producers Collective and FWD-DOC, a recent Filmmaker-In-Residence at Jacob Burns Film Center in New York, and an artist-in-residence at Somerset House Studios. She frequently consults, mentors, speaks on panels and offers masterclasses, including at Sheffield Doc/Fest and Women In Film & Television. She is the 2019 Simon Relph Memorial Bursary awardee.

Filmography
Trans In America (producer) – documentary series (2018) 
Jackie Kay: One Person, Two Names (director) – documentary short (2017) – Tate Queer British Art 2017
Unrest (producer) – documentary feature (2017) – 2017 Sundance Film Festival
Unrest VR (co-producer) – virtual reality experience (2017) – 2017 Tribeca Film Festival
Tate Shots: Georgia O’Keeffe directed by Petra Collins (executive producer) – short (2018) – Vogue.com   
Tate Shots: Harun Farocki (director/producer) – documentary short (2016) – Tate Modern 
Tate Shots: Yinka Shonibare (director/producer) – documentary short (2016) – Tate Modern 
Tate Shots: Agnes Martin (director/producer) – documentary short (2016) – Tate Modern 
Tate Shots: Parviz Tanavoli (director/producer) – documentary short (2016) – Tate Modern 
Alexis Hunter: Approach To Fear (director/producer) – documentary short (2014) 
Little Ones (producer) – documentary short - 2013 Underwire Film Festival
Lost and Sound (director/producer) – feature documentary (2012)  - South By Southwest Film Festival - Winner, Special Jury Award, DORF Music Film Festival, Croatia
RSC: Much Ado About Nothing (director/producer) - documentary short (2012) - BBC/The Space/Royal Shakespeare Company 
Making Sense of My Senses (director/producer) – documentary short (2011) - Community Channel
TRIBES (Royal Court Theatre) (director/producer) - d/Deaf-accessible shorts (2010) - Royal Court Theatre
Close Your Eyes and Look at Me (director/producer) – documentary short - 2009 True/False Film Festival

References

External links

1982 births
Living people
British film directors
British film producers
Alumni of Goldsmiths, University of London